This is a list of results for all the matches played from 1951 to 2010 by the Rio de Janeiro state football team.

Results

References

Rio de Janeiro state football team results